Stratos Tzortzoglou is a Greek actor. He was discovered by the stage director Karolos Koun in 1987.

Early life

He was born 5 August 1965 in Athens. He studied at Karolos Koun's Art Theater school.

Awards 
 National Greek Award, best male actor, Up, Down and Sideways
 Stars De Demain, best supporting actor, Landscape in the Mist

Selected filmography
 Sti Skia tou Polemou (1999-2000)
 To Simadi tou Erota (1998-1999)
 Palirria (1996-1997)
 Pano kato ke plagios (1993)
 Oi frouroi tis Achaias (1992-1993)
 The Striker with Number 9 (1989)
 Landscape in the Mist (1988)

External links

1965 births
Greek male stage actors
Greek male film actors
Greek male television actors
Living people
20th-century Greek male actors
Actors from Piraeus